Vilda may refer to:

 Jorge Vilda (born 1981), Spanish football coach
 Cape Vilda, Russian Federation

See also
 Den vilda (album), a 1996 album by Swedish band One More Time
 "Den vilda", a song by One More Time